Rosati may refer to:

 Rosati (surname)
 Rosati involution
 Rosati Windows
 Rosati, Missouri
 Rosati-Kain High School
 Wilson Sonsini Goodrich & Rosati